Ledenbergia is a genus of flowering plants belonging to the family Petiveriaceae.

Its native range is Mexico to southern Tropical America. It is found in Colombia, Costa Rica, Ecuador, El Salvador, Guatemala, Mexico, Nicaragua, Peru and Venezuela.

The genus name of Ledenbergia is in honour of Johann Philipp von Ladenberg (1769–1847), a Prussian lawyer who founded an educational institute for the sons of underprivileged forest officials. It was first described and published in A.P.de Candolle, Prodr. Vol.13 (Series 2) on page 14 in 1849.

Known species
According to Kew:
Ledenbergia macrantha 
Ledenbergia peruviana 
Ledenbergia seguierioides

References

Petiveriaceae
Caryophyllales genera
Plants described in 1849
Flora of Mexico
Flora of Central America
Flora of northern South America
Flora of western South America